Don King Boxing is a boxing video game developed by 2K Shanghai and published by 2K Sports for Nintendo DS and Wii in 2009.

Reception

The game received "mixed or average reviews" on both platforms according to the review aggregation website Metacritic.

References

External links
 
 

2009 video games
2K Sports games
Black people in art
Boxing video games
King
King
Video games based on real people
Video games developed in China
Wii games
Single-player video games